Highways in Croatia are the main transport network in Croatia.
The Croatian classification includes several classes of highways:

 The main motorway routes are prefixed with an A (for autocesta) and accompanied by one or two digits. They are controlled-access highways with tolls using a ticket system.
 Expressways (brza cesta) are toll-free limited-access highways with grade-separated intersections and fast speed limits. They are similar to the motorways, but are not always dual carriageways and they may have no emergency lanes. Their speed limit is always lower than the motorways. They either have standalone designations or are parts of non-motorway state routes, such as the D prefixed highways described further below.
 Roads dedicated for motor vehicles (cesta namijenjena isključivo za promet motornih vozila), which is another category of limited-access highways. They usually have multiple lanes and separated carriageways but may have at-grade intersections. This class of roads has no specific numbering convention, only a dedicated traffic sign. State routes (D roads) or portions thereof may be designated in this manner. An example is Jadranska Avenue in Zagreb, designated as Ž1040, a county road.

Other than the motorway routes, the national road classification includes the following enumerated categories of routes in the national highway system, with decreasing order of priority:
 State roads, which are marked by letter D (državna cesta) and a single, double or triple digit number.
 County roads always are marked by letter Ž (županijska cesta) and a four digit number.
 The lowest classification comprises local roads, marked by letter L (lokalna cesta) and a five digit number.

Road operators differ according to the classification system: The designated motorways are operated by three different concessionaires. The state roads are maintained almost exclusively by Hrvatske ceste, while the county and local roads are managed by various county authorities. The road maintenance agencies are governed by various laws issued by the Parliament as well as bylaws issued by the Ministry of Transport.

Motorways

They are marked with a special road sign, similar to the road sign depicting a motorway/autoroute/autobahn in other parts of Europe.

Motorways in Croatia are defined by the Ministry of Maritime Affairs, Transport and Infrastructure. The same applies to names of the motorway interchanges and rest areas.

History

A major reason for the motorway construction "mania" of the 2000s is a previous political halt of the major Croatian highway project, today's A1, in the 1970s and 1980s under former Yugoslavia. When Croatia declared independence in 1991, the only true motorways in the country were Rijeka–Kikovica (the westernmost part of today's A6), Zagreb–Karlovac (the northernmost part of today's A1) and Zagreb–Slavonski Brod (the central part of today's A3), the latter being part of the Brotherhood and Unity Highway. The dream to connect the two largest Croatian cities Zagreb and Split with a motorway went back to the times of the Croatian Spring. However, the construction of this project had not happened during Yugoslav period.

In 2005, the Zagreb–Split route was constructed. In addition, the A1 was extended towards Dubrovnik (currently at Ploče), and the A3 was extended so it connects Zagreb to Croatian borders with both Serbia (near Lipovac) and Slovenia (near Bregana). There is also a motorway from Zagreb to Rijeka, the A6, as well as the A4 motorway from Zagreb to the northeast (Hungarian border) as well as the A2 motorway from Zagreb to the northwest (Slovenian border). The A9 between Pula and the Slovenian border is also largely completed.

The construction of additional motorways has noticeably slowed in the 2010s, but it continues. , the Cerovlje–Rijeka section of A8, the remaining part of the Istrian Y, is being upgraded from semi-highway status. The other motorways are in various early stages of development, coming up to a total of 11 motorway routes. The A1 is considered unfinished as it is planned to be extended from Ploče to Dubrovnik.

Operators

The network is managed by 3 operators, of which one is under full government control and other two are operated by joint ventures.

Motorways and sections

List of motorways

Motorway sections under construction

Planned motorway sections

Traffic cost revenue 
In 2020, the network had a traffic of 69,714,444 vehicles, including 60,476,407 light vehicles and 9,239,630 heavy vehicles (
difference by axle height).

The travel cost is 5.50 euros per 100 km for light vehicles in closed system and 5.10 euros in open toll system, while for heavy ones are 24.00 euros per 100 km in closed system and 20.6 in open system.

Those costs generate a revenue of 365.9 millions of euros in 2021.

Accidents 
Two third of motorway fatalities (67%) occurred in the third of the year between July and October.

Expressways

There is a wide variety of types of expressways in Croatia, in terms of number of lanes, accessibility and types of intersections comprised. They range from four lane expressways with grade-separated intersections and limited access - distinguished from the motorways by lack of emergency lanes only - to four or six lane urban expressways with numerous at-grade intersections and traffic lights or two lane limited access roads with grade separated intersections. The expressways include both incomplete motorways, built in stages, and some state roads (with either limited access, more than two traffic lanes, grade-separated intersections or any combination thereof). There are even some instances of county roads which may be regarded expressways such as Jadranska Avenue (Ž1040).

As a rule, the expressways are not tolled, however major tunnels on the expressways are tolled.

List of completed expressways

State roads

State roads are defined by legislation as important routes for road traffic between various parts of the country. Classification of a road as a state road does not describe actual conditions of the road itself.

State roads in Croatia are assigned one, two or three digit numbers which generally comply with the following pattern (although there are some exceptions to the rules):

 1-19 are assigned to trunk roads, normally of considerable length, spanning between borders of various neighboring countries. An obvious exception to this is the D9 state road however it spans from Bosnia and Herzegovina border and the Adriatic Sea, along the southernmost portion of Pan-European Corridor Vc.
 20-99 are assigned to arterial roads on the mainland.
 100s are assigned to island roads
 200s are assigned to border crossing access roads.
 300s are assigned to junction roads, connecting towns or cities (but not other state roads) to motorways or other major roads. Notable exceptions to this are D307 and D310 state roads, although the D307 originally did not connect to the D29, but only to the A2 motorway.
 400s are assigned to mainland port and airport access roads.
 500s are assigned to connecting roads, connecting two different state roads. Notable exceptions to this rule are the D503 which connects to a port and the D516 which connects to a border crossing checkpoint.
 600s are provisional designations. For example, the road containing Pelješac bridge, from Komarna (D8) to Ston (D416), is designated as D674.

D1 - D14

D20 - D77

D100 - D128

Tolls
In the Republic of Croatia, primarily a closed toll system is applied to the entire motorway network tolls with multiple entrances and exits. The use of motorways is charged by mileage and vehicle category. At the entrance on the motorway, the user picks up the entrance card (or a record recorded on the ENC device) and the payment is made on exit toll stations according to the length of the trip. The open system is in use at toll stations Bregana(A3) and Rupa(A7).

Safety
Croatia had 73 road deaths per million inhabitants estimated in 2019.

See also
 Transport in Croatia
 Hrvatske autoceste
 Autocesta Rijeka – Zagreb
 BINA Istra
 Autocesta Zagreb – Macelj
 Hrvatske ceste
 List of controlled-access highway systems
 Evolution of motorway construction in European nations
 Speed limits in Croatia

Maps

References

External links

 HUKA - Croatian Association of Toll Motorways Concessionaires
 Exit lists of autoceste

 
Road transport in Croatia